Clare Akamanzi is a Rwandan lawyer, public administrator, businesswoman and politician, who has served as the executive director and chief executive officer of the Rwanda Development Board, since 4 February 2017. The position is a cabinet-level appointment by the President of Rwanda. In the cabinet reshuffle of 31 August 2017, Akamanzi was retained in cabinet and she retained her portfolio.

Background and education
Akamanzi was born in Uganda to Rwandan refugee parents in 1979. She is the fourth-born in a family of six siblings. She attained pre-university education in various parts of Uganda. The family moved a lot, because her parents were refugees in Uganda. 

She is married and a mother to one child. She holds a Bachelor of Laws, awarded by Makerere University, in Kampala, Uganda's capital city. She also holds the Diploma in Legal Practice, obtained from the Law Development Centre, also in Kampala.

Her Master of Laws in trade and investment law was obtained from the University of Pretoria, in South Africa. She also holds a Masters in Public Administration, obtained from Harvard University, in Cambridge, Massachusetts, in the United States. She received an honorary degree in Laws from Concordia University in June 2018.

Career
She began her career in 2004 in Geneva, Switzerland at the World Trade Organization (WTO) headquarters. The government of Rwanda appointed her as a diplomat/special trade negotiator at the WTO. Later, she transferred to the Rwandan embassy in London, the United Kingdom as the commercial diplomat (commercial attaché).

She returned to Rwanda in 2006 and was appointed Deputy Director General of the then Rwanda Investment and Export Promotion Agency (RIEPA) "before RDB was merged with other institutions in 2008". In 2008, Akamanzi became the Deputy chief executive officer responsible for Business Operations and Services, at RDB. She later transitioned to being the chief operating officer of the Rwanda Development Board. She then took study leave to pursue graduate studies in the United States. When she returned, she served as "Head of Strategy and Policy" in the President's Office.

In 2020, the World Health Organization (WHO) announced that Akamanzi was one of the founding board members of the WHO Foundation.

Other activities
 Africa Europe Foundation (AEF), Member of the High-Level Group of Personalities on Africa-Europe Relations (since 2020)

Publications 
 In the Trenches: Open for Business
 RWANDA'S PUSH FOR FIVE-STAR DEVELOPMENT: AN INTERVIEW WITH THE CEO OF THE RWANDA DEVELOPMENT BOARD ON THE PRESENT AND FUTURE OF RWANDAN ECONOMIC DEVELOPMENT
 DEVELOPMENT AT CROSSROADS: THE ECONOMIC PARTNERSHIP AGREEMENT NEGOTIATIONS WITH EASTERN AND SOUTHERN AFRICAN COUNTRIES ON TRADE IN SERVICES

See also
 Valentine Rugwabiza

References

External links

 Website of the Rwanda Development Board
https://twitter.com/cakamanzi?ref_src=twsrc%5Egoogle%7Ctwcamp%5Eserp%7Ctwgr%5Eauthor
https://www.linkedin.com/in/clare-akamanzi-6a46a783?originalSubdomain=rw

Living people
1979 births
Government ministers of Rwanda
Makerere University alumni
Law Development Centre alumni
University of Pretoria alumni
Harvard Kennedy School alumni
Rwandan businesspeople
Rwandan women in business
Women government ministers of Rwanda
21st-century Rwandan women politicians
21st-century Rwandan politicians